Freddie Hoffman is an American disabled sportsman. He has ridden his bicycle in the cause of the leukemia research and raised more than 3.81 million dollars.

Early life
He is from River Edge, New Jersey. He has profound learning disabilities. As a child Hoffman had few if any friends and was attracted to bicycle riding as his escape from loneliness. His heroes were the astronauts who had been to the moon and his goal was to pedal his bicycle the distance to the moon and back. He describes his childhood bicycle as being his "rocket ship".

Bicycling
Hoffman keeps mileage logs.  He has ridden across the United States and has visited every one of the contiguous 48 states and been honored by more than 30 state governors.
Every Spring Hoffman calls on his friends and supporters, now numbering in the hundreds, to get pledges to the Leukemia and Lymphoma Foundation for his upcoming ride that summer.

Personal life
Hoffman's mother died of leukemia in 1986.  In addition to naming his bicycles "Ruth E." after her, he has focused on raising money in her memory to support leukemia research.

He is a part-time janitor at a church in New Jersey.

References

Copy of article from Bicycling
posterous.com profiled Freddie Hoffman in issue 42, published in March 2010 by Gary J. Boulanger.

People from River Edge, New Jersey
Living people
American disabled sportspeople
Year of birth missing (living people)